Abardeh-ye Sofla (also Romanized as Abardeh-e Soflá; also known as Abar Deh-e Pā’īn and Abardeh-ye Pā’īn) is a village in Shandiz Rural District, Shandiz District, Torqabeh and Shandiz County, Razavi Khorasan Province, Iran. At the 2006 census, its population was 262, in 85 families.

See also 

 List of cities, towns and villages in Razavi Khorasan Province

References 

Populated places in Torqabeh and Shandiz County